An étagère or shelf is a French set of hanging or standing open shelves for the display of collections of objects or ornaments.

The étagère became a popular form of furniture in the nineteenth century. Similar to the what-not, the shelves of the étagère provided extra space for the display of the accumulation of knickknacks that was typical of Victorian home decor.

References

External links
 
 

French design
Furniture
History of furniture